Hangry & Angry-f (stylized as HANGRY & ANGRY-f, previously known as hANGRY & ANGRY) was a Japanese female pop and rock duo created in 2008, consisting of former Morning Musume members Hitomi Yoshizawa ("Hangry") and Rika Ishikawa ("Angry").

The duo was a collaboration with a Harajuku fashion store, which sells fashion designer h.Naoto's mascot kittens of the same name. The band served to promote stuffed toys and various other products from the store.

History
The duo was officially announced via the opening of their MySpace account in October 2008. The page drew 100,000 views within four days, and quickly reached one million views.

Their first mini-album, Kill Me Kiss Me, was released simultaneously in Japan and South Korea on 19 November 2008.

It was not initially revealed who the two girls really were, though fans quickly recognized them and they later revealed themselves to be Yoshizawa and Ishikawa.

As of 2009, the duo became known as Hangry & Angry-f, the "f" referring their new future style of white costumes.

In April 2009, they made their overseas debut at Sakura-Con in Seattle, Washington.

Discography

Albums

Singles

See also

 List of Gan-Shin artists
 List of Japanese musicians
 List of musical artists from Japan
 List of rock musicians
 List of Zetima artists
 Music of Japan

References

External links

 , the duo's official website 
  (some English; bulk in Japanese), another official website
 
 TiBer0use (27 June 2010).  "Interview:  Hangry&Angry" (in French).  mata-web.com.  Retrieved 22 February 2013.

2008 establishments in Japan
21st-century Japanese musicians
Gan-Shin artists
Japanese girl groups
Japanese idol groups
Japanese musical duos
Japanese pop rock music groups
Musical groups established in 2008
Rock music duos
Musical groups from Tokyo
Up-Front Group
21st-century women musicians
Female musical duos